Värmland County or held a county council election on 14 September 2014, on the same day as the general and municipal elections.

Results
The number of seats remained at 81 with the Social Democrats winning the most at 31, a drop of two from 2010. The party received 40.2% of the 179,280 valid ballots cast.

Municipalities

References

Elections in Värmland County
Värmland